Jonathan Yulián Mejía Chaverra (born 28 July 1990) is a Colombian professional footballer who plays as a midfielder for Unión Española.

Honours

Club
Deportes Tolima
 Copa Colombia: 2014

Atlético Nacional
 Categoría Primera A: 2015-II

References

1990 births
Living people
Colombian footballers
Colombian expatriate footballers
Association football midfielders
Atlético Nacional footballers
Millonarios F.C. players
Deportes Tolima footballers
Independiente Medellín footballers
Club Atlético Tigre footballers
Envigado F.C. players
Atlético Bucaramanga footballers
Sporting Cristal footballers
Unión Española footballers
Categoría Primera A players
Argentine Primera División players
Chilean Primera División players
Peruvian Primera División players
Colombian expatriate sportspeople in Argentina
Colombian expatriate sportspeople in Chile
Expatriate footballers in Argentina
Expatriate footballers in Chile
Expatriate footballers in Peru
Footballers from Medellín